William T. Redmond (1853–1894) was an American professional baseball shortstop. He played in the National Association with the St. Louis Red Stockings (1875). He played part of the 1877 season with the Cincinnati Reds of the National League between stints in the League Alliance. He played for the NL's Milwaukee Grays in 1878, then with the Rockford White Stockings of the Northwestern League in 1879.

External links

Baseball players from Missouri
St. Louis Red Stockings players
Cincinnati Reds (1876–1879) players
Milwaukee Grays players
19th-century baseball players
1853 births
1894 deaths
Major League Baseball shortstops
Memphis Reds (League Alliance) players
Milwaukee (minor league baseball) players
Rockford White Stockings players